August Ritter may refer to:

August Gottfried Ritter (1811–1885), German composer
August Ritter (civil engineer) (1826–1908)
Bill Ritter (August William "Bill" Ritter) (born 1956), governor of Colorado 2007–2011

See also
Ritter (surname)